Alhassan Sayibu Suhuyini (born 12 September 1979) is a Ghanaian broadcast journalist and politician. He belongs to the National Democratic Congress. He is currently a member of the Seventh Parliament of the Fourth Republic of Ghana representing Tamale North.

Education 
Alhassan Suhuyini attended Ghana Secondary School now Ghana Senior High School (Tamale), GHANASCO in Tamale.
He holds a B.Sc. Public Administration and an M.Sc. Development management from Ghana Institute of Management and Public Administration.

Career
His career as a radio presenter started at Diamond FM in Tamale before he moved to the capital of Ghana. He had brief stints with Citi FM and Metro TV in Accra before settling with Radio Gold. He was voted Talk Show Host of the year in 2011, 2012 and 2013 by Radio listeners in Ghana at the Ghana Radio and Television Personality Awards. In 2013 he was selected and sponsored by the South Korean government to tour South Korea as part of its Next Generational Leaders from Africa program. He was a delegate at the 2014 International Visitor Leadership Program, a United States Department of State professional exchange program. He worked at Radio Gold in Accra, where he was the host of two of the station's flagship programs; the morning show called the "Gold Power Drive" and the weekend socio-economic and political current affairs program - Alhaji and Alhaji talk show.

Political career 
He was appointed in 2013 by president John Dramani Mahama as board member of Ghana Civil Aviation Authority (GCAA).  he was the Communications Manager for the National Hajj Council (Ghana). He won the Tamale North seat by the ticket of the National Democratic Congress in the 2016 General election to become the member of parliament. He won the seat by getting 21,280 votes representing 67.79% of the total number.

Personal life
Suhuyini is a trained teacher. He married Hamdiya Amadu Yakubu Vorsky in 2013.

References 

Living people
Ghanaian Muslims
Dagomba people
Year of birth missing (living people)
Ghanaian MPs 2021–2025
Ghana Senior High School (Tamale) alumni